Michigan's 18th Senate district is one of 38 districts in the Michigan Senate. The 18th district was created by the 1850 Michigan Constitution, as the 1835 constitution only permitted a maximum of eight senate districts. It has been represented by Republican Thomas Albert since 2023, succeeding Democrat Jeff Irwin.

Geography
District 18 encompasses all of Barry County, as well as parts of Allegan, Calhoun, Ionia, Kalamazoo, and Kent counties.

2011 Apportionment Plan
District 18, as dictated by the 2011 Apportionment Plan, was based in the city of Ann Arbor – home to the University of Michigan – also covering the nearby Washtenaw County communities of Ypsilanti, Saline, Pittsfield Township, Ypsilanti Township, and Superior Township.

The district was largely located within Michigan's 12th congressional district, with a small portion extending into the 7th district. It overlapped with the 52nd, 53rd, 54th, and 55th districts of the Michigan House of Representatives.

List of senators

Recent election results

2018

2014

Federal and statewide results in District 18

Historical district boundaries

References 

18
Washtenaw County, Michigan